Digital access carrier system (DACS) is the name used by British Telecom (BT Group plc) in the United Kingdom for a 0+2 pair gain system.

Usage 
For almost as long as telephones have been a common feature in homes and offices, telecommunication companies have regularly been faced with a situation where demand in a particular street or area exceeds the number of physical copper pairs available from the pole to the exchange.

Until the early 1980s, this situation was often dealt with by providing shared or 'party' lines, which were connected to multiple customers. This raised privacy problems since any subscriber connected to the line could listen to (or indeed, interrupt) another subscriber's call.

With advances in the size, price, and reliability of electronic equipment, it eventually became possible to provide two normal subscriber lines over one copper pair, eliminating the need for party lines. The more modern ISDN technology based digital systems that perform this task are known in Britain by the generic name 'DACS'.

DACS works by digitising the analogue signal and sending the combined digital information for both lines over the same copper pair between the exchange and the pole. The cost of the DACS equipment is significantly less than the cost of installing additional copper pairs.

Overview 
The DACS system consists of three main parts:

The exchange unit (EU), which connects multiple pairs of analogue lines to their corresponding single digital lines. One Telspec EU rack connects as many as 80 analogue lines over 40 digital copper pairs.
The copper pair between the exchange and the remote unit, carrying the digital signal between the exchange unit and the remote unit.
The remote unit (RU), which connects two analogue customer lines to one digital copper pair. The RUs are usually to be found on poles within a few hundred metres of the subscribers' homes or businesses.

Advantages 
Because it uses a digital signal along most of the distance between subscriber and exchange, DACS is less prone to electrical interference than the more usual analogue line.
The DACS system has built-in monitoring from the exchange. An alert is generated if the connection is lost or errors occur. This contrasts with a conventional analogue line, where the fault will usually not be known until a customer complains.

DACS and modems 
The 56kbit/s speed of analogue modems can only be achieved if there is a single digital to analogue conversion in the route from the ISP to the end user. Since DACS involves an additional conversion to digital, and then back to analogue, this means that the maximum possible bitrate over a DACS line is 33.6 kbit/s. Furthermore, many 56 kbit/s modems are unable to successfully negotiate even this speed over a DACS line. DSL broadband internet connections cannot work on a DACS line as they rely on a copper pair running all the way to the telephone exchange.

Since BT's traditional telephone line service is contractually only required to support voice and fax communication, BT are not obliged to remove a DACS because of problems with 56kbit/s modems.

Technical 
This section contains more technical detail on the 3 main subsystems that make DACS.

Who makes it? 
BT sourced DACS from two different companies: Telspec and ECI. Each BT region installed either one or the other; e.g. in South Wales, ECI DACS is fitted, while in Kent, Telspec DACS is used.

Definitions 
WB900 – an analogue radio frequency based system that did not support even low speed data communications. Installed from the early 1980s. Now rarely encountered.

DACS1 – first generation digital system that did not support CLI but supported low-speed data communication devices such as fax machines. Installed from around 1990. DACS1 is no longer used in new installations.

DACS2 – released in the mid 1990s, DACS2 was an upgrade to DACS1 with support for CLI and higher data speeds (but see below). DACS2 is fundamentally similar to DACS1 in operation.

DACS – DACS1 and DACS2 are commonly known simply as 'DACS'. Most DACS installations in the UK are now DACS2.

How did WB900 work? 
Before DACS, WB900 (a 1 + 1 analogue carrier system) was used. The first subscriber's phone (called the 'audio customer') would be connected as normal. The second subscriber (called the 'carrier customer') would have his phone calls modulated on to an RF carrier or Carrier wave on the same physical phone line at around 40 kHz – high enough not to be noticeable to the audio customer.

See also
Subscriber Loop Carrier
Digital access and cross-connect system – an American system for which the initialism DACS is also used.

Notes

External links
 ADSL customers and DACS at virgin.net
 frank.gwc.org.uk Problems with DACS and V.92 Modems

BT Group
Local loop
Telecommunications equipment